Belin is a commune in Covasna County, Transylvania, Romania composed of two villages: Belin and Belin-Vale (Bölönpatak).

Demographics

Belin has a relative Roma majority. At the 2011 census, 46.9% of inhabitants were Roma, 36.7% Székely Hungarians and 13.7% Romanians.

In 2002, 33.4% of inhabitants were Pentecostal, 30.2% Unitarian, 19.8% Romanian Orthodox, 9.7% Reformed, 3.1% belonged to another religion, 1.3% had no religion and 1.1% were Roman Catholic.

References

External links
 Census 2002

Communes in Covasna County
Localities in Transylvania